The listed buildings in Barnsley are arranged by wards as follows:

 Listed buildings in Barnsley (Central Ward)
 Listed buildings in Barnsley (Kingstone Ward)
 Listed buildings in Barnsley (Old Town Ward)

Lists of listed buildings in Yorkshire